Ligustrum pricei is a species of Ligustrum, native to China (Guizhou, Hubei, Hunan, Shaanxi, Sichuan) and Taiwan, where it occurs at 900–1700 m altitude.

Ligustrum pricei is an evergreen shrub or small tree growing to 1–8 m tall. The leaves are 1.5–6 cm long and 1.5–6 cm broad, with an acute apex and an entire margin. The flowers are white, 6–8 mm diameter, produced in panicles 2–7 cm long.

Medicinal uses
A potential analgesic and anti-inflammatory  plant.

Etymology
Ligustrum means ‘binder’. It was named by Pliny and Virgil.

References

pricei
Flora of Taiwan
Flora of Guizhou
Flora of Hubei
Flora of Hunan
Flora of Shaanxi
Flora of Sichuan
Flora of China
Plants described in 1915
Taxonomy articles created by Polbot